3P or 3p may refer to:

 3P, People Planet Profit, or Triple bottom line
 3P, Aruban Tiara Air's IATA airline designator
 3P, proved plus probable plus possible Oil reserves
 3p, an arm of Chromosome 3 (human)
 People's Policy Project, a US think tank

See also 
 P3 (disambiguation)
 Third party (disambiguation), often abbreviated 3P